Kissimmee station is a train station in Kissimmee, Florida. It is served by Amtrak, the national railroad passenger system of the United States, and SunRail, the commuter rail system serving Greater Orlando. The station opened in 1883, and has served several different railroads. It is the closest Amtrak station to Walt Disney World.

History

Kissimmee station was originally built as a South Florida Railroad Depot 1883, and was also a junction for the St. Cloud and Sugar Belt Railway and the original Florida Midland Railroad, all three of which were eventually acquired by the Atlantic Coast Line Railroad. It was replaced by an Atlantic Coast Line Depot in 1910, which is the building that remains to this day. The station was restored in 1976, but suffered some damage to the canopy during the 2004 Atlantic hurricane season that was repaired within two years. Sometime prior to 1990, it also contained a separate Railway Express Agency building, that was previously the site of the original South Florida Railroad depot.

Kissimmee station is located on E. Dakin Avenue southeast of Pleasant Street. The sheltered low-level Amtrak platform crosses Dakin Avenue and runs as far west as Monument Avenue. An unsheltered asphalt platform continues southwest of Monument Avenue for boarding especially long trains.

SunRail service
The Kissimmee Amtrak is part of Phase 2 expansion of the SunRail commuter rail system, opened on July 30, 2018. To accommodate this new service, the station underwent numerous upgrades, including the addition of a 381 space park and ride garage, a bus drop off area, and the addition of a second track and two raised side platforms northeast of the existing ground level platform.  These additions are also integrated into the city of Kissimmee's long-range plans for an intermodal center.

Connections
Lynx; #10, #18, #26, #55, #56, #57, #108, #208, #407, #441, #632.
Greyhound Lines; Service to Miami and points to the south and New York City, Washington, D.C., Boston and intermediate points to the north.

References

External links

Kissimmee/Amtrak Station (SunRail)
Kissimmee Amtrak Station (USA Rail Guide -- Train Web)
September 14, 1999 Photo by Bill Hakkarinen (Amtrak Photo Archives)
Image from Dynamic Depot Maps

Amtrak stations in Florida
Transportation buildings and structures in Osceola County, Florida
Atlantic Coast Line Railroad stations
Railway stations in the United States opened in 1883
Buildings and structures in Kissimmee, Florida
SunRail stations
1883 establishments in Florida